Rubroboletus haematinus is a bolete fungus of the genus Rubroboletus. First described scientifically in 1976 by Roy Halling as a species of Boletus, in 2015 it was transferred to Rubroboletus, a genus circumscribed the year previously to contain other allied reddish colored, blue-staining bolete species. It is found in the western United States.

See also
List of North American boletes

References

External links

Fungi described in 1976
Fungi of the United States
haematinus
Fungi without expected TNC conservation status